Beren Yeşilırmak (born June 1, 2005 in Mersin, Turkey) is a Turkish female volleyball player. She plays for Galatasaray.

Youth career
Yeşilırmak, who was born in Mersin on June 1, 2005, started volleyball in Mersin Yenişehir. After her education at Mersin Toros College, she transferred to the Galatasaray youth team in 2017.

Club career

Galatasaray
She was included in the Galatasaray A Team squad in the 2019-20 season.

On 13 October 2019, Galatasaray HDI Sigorta Women's Volleyball Team faced Nilüfer Belediye on the road in the first week match of the Vestel Venus Sultans League of the 2019-20 volleyball season. Beren entered the game in the 2nd set of the match and used the service, wearing the Galatasaray jersey for the first time in an official match.

On February 7, 2022, Galatasaray extended the contract of Yeşilırmak for 2 more years.

İstanbul Büyükşehir Belediyespor (loan)
She played for 	İstanbul Büyükşehir Belediyespor with a double license on loan in the 2021–22 season. Istanbul team competed in the  Turkish Women's First Volleyball League.

References

External links
Player profile at Galatasaray.org
Player profile at Volleybox.net

2005 births
Living people
Turkish women's volleyball players
Galatasaray S.K. (women's volleyball) players
21st-century Turkish sportswomen